World of Sleepers is the second studio album by Swedish ambient duo Carbon Based Lifeforms, released in 2006.

Track listing

World of Sleepers starts at track 12, indicating that it is a continuation of Hydroponic Garden. All tracks are written by Johannes Hedberg and Daniel Ringström.

External links
 Carbon Based Lifeforms official website.
  at Last.fm, where the entire album is available for streaming.

2006 albums
Carbon Based Lifeforms albums